Lisa Irene Chappell (born 18 October 1968) is a New Zealand actress and musician. She is known for her roles as Chelsea Redfern in Gloss (1987–90), her acting debut, and as Claire McLeod in McLeod's Daughters (2001–03), a performance which earned her two Logie Awards, for Most Popular New Female Talent and Most Popular Actress. 

As one of New Zealand's most prominent theatre performers, Chappell made her stage debut in 1991, having appeared in The Merchant of Venice, which led to numerous roles, including Chicago, Hamlet, Design for Living, and The Thirty-Nine Steps. Following the establishment of her own company, Chappell has went on to appearances in more contemporary works, in addition to producing and writing. 

While maintaining her continued success on screen, Chappell has had also appeared in films, such as Desperate Remedies (1993), Jack Brown Genius (1996), and Coffin Rock (2009), and further television roles, in City Life (1996–98), The Cult (2009), for which she was the recipient of a Qantas Film and Television Award for Best Performance by a Supporting Actress – General Television, and most recently as Michelle Beaufort in the soap opera, Shortland Street (2020–22).

Early life
Lisa Chappell was born in Takapuna, Auckland, New Zealand and grew up in Mairangi Bay. She has two older siblings, a brother, Mark, and a sister, Catherine. Chappell studied acting in the 1980s, and was educated at Rangitoto College, where she took drama classes and performed in school musicals, as well as singing and dancing tuition.

Career

Television
Chappell made her on-screen debut in 1987 when she was cast as Chelsea Redfern in the TV2 television drama, Gloss, a series which lasted three seasons. This was followed by a short stint in the police procedural series, Shark in the Park, and guest roles in shows, such as, soap opera Shortland Street, Mysterious Island, and multiple roles on Hercules: The Legendary Journeys. In 1996, she began appearing in a regular role on the short-lived TV2 soap opera, City Life, as Bronwyn Kellett.

In 1998, Chappell had relocated to Australia and completed "The Journey" program at the Actors Centre Australia in Sydney, Australia, graduating in 2000. After which, she auditioned for the role of Claire McLeod on the Nine Network rural drama series, McLeod's Daughters, a role which was originally intended for actor Laurie Foell during which Chappell was in the process of establishing a theatre company; she successfully secured the role following her audition. During production of the series, Chappell gained the skills in how to ride a horse and sheering sheep, and also made the decision to become a vegetarian. She appeared in the series for three seasons, from 2001 to 2003, before her character was killed off in a car accident. For her performance, Chappell was nominated for several Logie Awards, receiving two, for Most Popular New Female Talent and Most Popular Actress in 2002 and 2004, respectively, and has gained a cult following among both Australian and international audiences.

Chappell continued in Australian television, and would later appear in a recurring role on the police drama, Stingers, as Constable Megan Walsh for its eighth and final season, the television film, Small Claims: The Reunion, the serial drama The Cult, in a role with earned her a Qantas Film and Television Award, and guest appearances in Rescue: Special Ops and Cops L.A.C..

In 2020, Chappell returned to Shortland Street, and was cast in the regular role of Michelle Beaufort.

Theatre
Chappell is a well established theatre performer, having appeared in numerous stage productions for more three decades, and has worked extensively in New Zealand, particularly with the Auckland Theatre Company. Early in her career, she appeared in classical theatre productions, including William Shakespeare's The Merchant of Venice, the 
musical, Chicago, and Arthur Miller's All My Sons. She has also directed  and performed in two plays at Auckland's Rose Theatre – Up the Garden Path and Girl Talk in 1993 and 1994, respectively.

Following her graduation from the Actor's Centre Australia, Chappell has performed as the titular character in Educating Rita, which toured Australia in 2007, before returning to New Zealand to appear in productions, such as, Design for Living, The Thirty-Nine Steps, The Importance of Being Earnest, The Vagina Monologues, The Wizard of Oz, and Much Ado About Nothing.

Chappell has, more recently, appeared in roles in contemporary works, including  Fallen Angels, The Pink Hammer, That Bloody Woman, Bright Star, and Shortland Street – The Musical, and three plays which she wrote and produced – On/Off, Fred, and Bad Day Insurance.

She is a member of Equity New Zealand.

Singing
Chappell's debut album, When Then Is Now, was released on 1 May 2006. She did some minor touring in Australia and New Zealand to support the album's release.

Book
In 2021, Chappell wrote a children's book, Guardian Angel on Purpose Patrol. It was illustrated by Brad Smith and published by Divine Purpose Publishing. .

Personal life
Chappell met Chris Taylor in August 2001 when they both attended her McLeod's Daughters co-star, Rachael Carpani's 21st birthday; they married in December 2001, and divorced in 2005. She currently resides in Puhoi, New Zealand.

Filmography

Theatre credits
 The Merchant of Venice (Rose Theatre, 1991)
 Chicago (Auckland Operatic, 1992)
 Up the Garden Path (Rose Theatre, 1993)
 Girl Talk (Rose Theatre, 1994)
 The Lover (The PumpHouse Theatre, 1995)
 All My Sons (Maidment Theatre, 1997)
 The Herbal Bed (Court Theatre, 1998)
 Hamlet (Actors Centre Australia, 2000)
 A.R. Gurney's Love Letters (2005)
 The Homecoming (Auckland Arts Festival, 2007)
 Educating Rita (toured in Australia, 2007)
 Design for Living (Maidment Theatre, 2008)
 The Thirty-Nine Steps (Maidment Theatre, 2009)
 Don't Hold Your Breath (Maidment Theatre, 2009)
 The Importance of Being Earnest (Maidment Theatre, 2010)
 The Vagina Monologues (Basement Theatre, 2010)
 Mike & Virginia (Herald Theatre, 2011)
 The Wizard of Oz (Peach Theatre Company, 2011)
 The Motor Camp (Maidment Theatre, 2012)
 Much Ado About Nothing (Court Theatre, 2012)
 Badjelly the Witch (Bruce Mason Centre, 2013)
 On/Off (Bordello Theatre, 2013)
 Fallen Angels (Q Theatre, 2014)
 Fred (The Basement Theatre, 2014)
 Bad Day Insurance (Old 505 Theatre, 2014)
 Detroit (Darlinghurst Theatre, 2015)
 Polo (Sky City Theatre, 2016)
 The Pink Hammer (The PumpHouse Theatre, 2016)
 Menopause The Musical (2016)
 Peer Gynt (ASB Waterfront Theatre, 2017)
 Two (2017)
 That Bloody Woman (Centrepoint Theatre, 2018)
 Bright Star (Herald Theatre, 2018)
 Shortland Street - The Musical (ASB Waterfront Theatre, 2018)
 Six Degrees of Separation (ASB Waterfront Theatre, 2019)
 Rosencrantz and Guildenstern Are Dead (ASB Waterfront Theatre, 2019)

Awards and nominations

Notes

References

External links
Official Lisa Chappell Site

 

1968 births
Living people
New Zealand stage actresses
New Zealand television actresses
New Zealand soap opera actresses
Logie Award winners
21st-century New Zealand women singers
People educated at Rangitoto College
20th-century New Zealand actresses
21st-century New Zealand actresses
People from Takapuna
</ref>